Synduality (stylized in all caps) is a Japanese mixed-media project created by the Bandai Namco Group. A third-person shooter mecha videogame developed by Game Studio and published by Bandai Namco Entertainment will be released for Microsoft Windows, PlayStation 5 and Xbox Series X/S in 2023. An anime television series produced by Bandai Namco Filmworks and animated by Eight Bit is also set to premiere in 2023 on TV Tokyo and other networks. The series is directed by Yusuke Yamamoto, with Takashi Aoshima writing the scripts based on a story draft by Hajime Kamoshida, Kenichirō Katsura designing the characters for animation, and Masato Nakayama composing the music. The series will be streamed worldwide on Disney+, in Latin America on Star+ and in the United States on Hulu.

Characters

Video game

Anime

References

External links 
 Project official website 
 Game official website 
 Anime official website 
 

2023 anime television series debuts
Action video games
Bandai Namco franchises
Bandai Namco games
Eight Bit (studio)
PlayStation 5 games
Science fiction video games
Third-person shooters
TV Tokyo original programming
Upcoming anime television series
Upcoming video games scheduled for 2023
Video games developed in Japan
Windows games
Xbox Series X and Series S games